The Notre Dame Fighting Irish men's soccer team represents the University of Notre Dame in National Collegiate Athletic Association Division I men's soccer. The team competes in the Atlantic Coast Conference and is currently coached by Chad Riley. The team has made twenty appearances in the NCAA Division I men's soccer tournament with the most recent coming in 2017 NCAA Division I Men's Soccer Championship. The Fighting Irish won the 2013 national championship.

Current squad

Year-by-year statistical leaders

References

External links